BMC Veterinary Research is a peer-reviewed open access veterinary science and medical journal that launched in 2005 published by BioMed Central. Part of the BMC Series of journals, it has a broad scope covering all aspects of veterinary science and medicine, including the epidemiology, diagnosis, prevention and treatment of medical conditions of domestic, farm and wild animals, as well as the biomedical processes that underlie their health.

Abstracting and indexing 
The journal is abstracted and indexed by PubMed, MEDLINE, CAS, EMBASE, Scopus, Current Contents, CABI and Web of Science. According to the Journal Citation Reports, its 2-year impact factor was 2.741 in 2020.

References

External links 
 

BioMed Central academic journals
Veterinary medicine in the United Kingdom
Veterinary medicine journals
Publications established in 2005
English-language journals
Creative Commons Attribution-licensed journals